Events in 1986 in Japanese television.

Debuts
Jikuu Senshi Spielban, tokusatsu (1986–1987)
Choushinsei Flashman, tokusatsu (1986–1987)
Hikari no Densetsu, anime (1986)
Miyuki, drama (special) (1986)
Saint Seiya, anime (1986–1989)
Sukeban Deka 3: Shōjo Ninpōjō Denki, drama (1986–1987)
 Dragon Ball, anime (1986–1989)
Maison Ikkoku, anime (1986-1988)

Ongoing shows
Music Fair, music (1964–present)
Mito Kōmon, jidaigeki (1969-2011)
Sazae-san, anime (1969–present)
Ōoka Echizen, jidaigeki (1970-1999)
FNS Music Festival, music (1974-present)
Panel Quiz Attack 25, game show (1975–present)
Doraemon, anime (1979-2005)
High School! Kimengumi, anime (1985–1987)
Ponytail wa Furimukanai, drama (1985–1986)
Touch, anime (1985–1987)

Endings
Blue Comet SPT Layzner, anime (1985–1986)
Dengeki Sentai Changeman, tokusatsu (1985–1986)
Kyojuu Tokusou Juspion, tokusatsu (1985–1986)
Musashi no Ken, anime (1985–1986)
Sukeban Deka II: Shōjo Tekkamen Densetsu, drama (1985–1986)
Urusei Yatsura, anime (1981–1986)
Dr. Slump, anime (1981-1986)

See also
1986 in anime
List of Japanese television dramas
1986 in Japan
List of Japanese films of 1986

References